Fang Bang is the second studio album by American horror punk musician Wednesday 13. It was released by Rykodisc on August 29, 2006, in Europe, and was later released worldwide on September 12, 2006. Each song on the album is known to have been inspired by a specific piece of horror fiction, such as An American Werewolf in London, Halloween and Friday the 13th. Fang Bang contains twelve standard tracks, as well as a bonus track exclusive to a particular region. The North American release includes a thirteenth track, a Roky Erickson cover of "Burn the Flames". The thirteenth track on the European release is a Motörhead cover of "R.A.M.O.N.E.S.". Finally, the Japanese release includes "R.A.M.O.N.E.S.", as well as a fourteenth track, an original composition titled "Good Day to Die".

"My Home Sweet Homicide" was released as a single and was accompanied with a music video of switching between the band performing and a clown arguing with his girlfriend then walking around the streets causing chaos, with members of the band being victims before being arrested and the ending reveals the clown's new girlfriend is Wednesday himself (dressed as a clown).

Concept
"Fang Bang" is Wednesday 13's most glam-influenced piece to date, with lighter, more 'fun' lyrical themes.  All the tracks on the album are linked in some way to specific horror films, and the album as a whole is less brooding and dark.

Track listing

Personnel
 Wednesday 13 – lead vocals and guitars
 Jamie Hoover – bass, add. background vocals, add. organ, add. guitars
 Ghastly – drums, percussion
 Kid Kid – background vocals

Release history

References

2006 albums
Rykodisc albums
Wednesday 13 albums
Horror punk albums